The wing-barred seedeater (Sporophila americana) is a  passerine bird from coastal regions of north-eastern South America in north-eastern Venezuela, Tobago, the Guianas, Amapá and north-eastern Pará (with a single record from Maranhão), Brazil, and along the Amazon River upstream to around Manaus. Formerly, it included the mainly Central American Sporophila corvina and the west Amazonian S. murallae as subspecies, in which case the combined species had the common name Variable Seedeater. Following the split, this common name is now restricted to S. corvina.

Description
Adult males have a relatively heavy black bill. The upperparts are black, except for a greyish rump (actually white finely streaked black, but only visible up-close) and two distinct white wing-bars (the lower often reduced). The underparts are white, except for a broad black pectoral collar (sometimes reduced and incomplete) and blackish mottling to the upper flanks. The far duller female has a brownish bill, dull buffy-olive upperparts and pale olive-ochre underparts. Juveniles resemble adult females.

Ecology
It is found in open or semi-open grassy areas and shrub, usually in pairs or small flocks. As with other Sporophila seedeaters, it mainly feeds on seeds, but has also been observed taking flowers, buds and fruits.

It remains fairly common in Suriname, French Guiana and parts of Brazil, and is therefore considered to be of least concern by BirdLife International and IUCN. It is rare to uncommon in Venezuela and Guyana where threatened by trapping for the wild bird trade.

References

 Hilty, Steven L. (2003): Birds of Venezuela. Christopher Helm, London. 
 Restall, R., Rodner, C., & Lentino, M. (2006). Birds of Northern South America. Vol. 1 & 2. Helm, London.  (vol. 1);  (vol. 2).
 Ridgely, R., & Greenfield, P. (2001). The Birds of Ecuador - Field Guide. Cornell University Press. 
 Stiles, F. Gary (1996): When black plus white equals gray: The Nature of variation in the Variable Seedeater complex (Emberizinae: Sporophila).  Ornitologia Neotropical 7 (2): 75-107.
 Stiles, F. Gary & Skutch, Alexander Frank (1989): A guide to the birds of Costa Rica. Comistock, Ithaca. 
 de Vasconcelos, M. F. (2004): First record of the Variable Seedeater (Sporophila americana) for the state of Maranhão, Brazil. Ararajuba 12(2): 145.
 Recognize four species of Sporophila within the Sporophila americana superspecies - South American Classification Committee.
 Wing-barred Seedeater (Sporophila americana): newly split and Least Concern? BirdLife International Forum.

External links
 Photo gallery - Mangoverde.
 Photo of male (listed as Sporophila corvina [sic]) - VIREO
 Photos and text (listed as Variable Seedeater [sic]) - Bird in Suriname.

wing-barred seedeater
Birds of the Guianas
Birds of Trinidad and Tobago
Birds of the Amazon Basin
wing-barred seedeater
wing-barred seedeater
Birds of Brazil